iWill Media is a Korean drama production company founded in 2010 by former KBS and Pan Entertainment executive Kim Jong-shik. As of July 2022, it now operates as a subsidiary of Terapin Studios, itself a division of NPX Capital.

Works

Production crew

Screenwriters
 Joo Chan-ok
 Choi Hyun-kyung
 Park Ye-kyung
 Oh Sang-hee
 Choi Ran
 Seo Yoon-hee
 Lee Ha-na
 Moon Jung-min
 Park Ji-ha
 Shin Jae-hyung
 Kim Ho-soo

Directors
 Kang Il-soo

References

External links
  

Television production companies of South Korea
Mass media companies established in 2010
Companies based in Seoul
South Korean companies established in 2010